Adult hits (sometimes also called variety hits) is a radio format drawing from popular music from the late 1960s to the present. The format typically focuses on adult contemporary, pop, and rock hits from the 1970s through at least the 1990s, and is synonymous with franchised brands such as Jack FM and Bob FM.

History

Forerunners of the adult hits format appeared on radio during the 1970s. At the time, enough of a backlog of popular music from the rock and roll era had developed to support a format based on them; oldies stations, however, were still very rare, and instead, stations that did not want to bind themselves to the current top 40 playlist would mix in current hits with the hits of the past two decades. This hybrid format began to fall out of favor in the 1980s as self-contained oldies stations rose to prominence. The Adult Hits format dates back to 1990 when 98.9 WMMO was launched in Orlando, Florida. Another predecessor was the short-lived "rhythm and rock" format run by KYOT in Phoenix, Arizona in the early 1990s. Adult hits stations target adults 25-54, and more specifically at 35- to 44-year-olds. Freeform could also be seen as another forerunner due to the freedom of music choice the DJ's had, very similar to what makes up the core basis of the adult hits format.

A large number of adult hits stations utilize male names as their branding. The practice was popularized by the franchised Jack FM and Bob FM brands, and has been widely imitated with other common male names.

Related formats
 "Traditional country" is a type of country music format that focuses primarily on neotraditional and country pop hits from the late-1980s to the 2000s, as well as current material that suits this sound (including songs by artists who were active during the era, as opposed to the more pop-leaning "bro-country" sound).
 A Spanish-language variation of the format, "Jose FM", is syndicated by Entravision.

Formatting

The adult hits format draws from a wide playlist of broad appeal, consisting primarily of adult contemporary, pop, and rock hits from the late 1960s through at least the 1990s—including but not limited to classic rock (including pop rock and hair metal), power ballads, dance pop, and new wave among others. The size of their music library and their focus on older music provide a contrast to other stations, which may heavily play certain popular songs throughout the day.

Due to its broad nature, the adult hits format can be easily automated. This means that the station can be run with little to no on-air personalities (a trait that, in some cases, may be openly promoted by the station), leaving only staff involved in station operations, advertising sales, and promotional presences.

Radio stations
Note: the below listing of radio stations is subject to change.

Canada
Bell Media and Rogers Media operate chains of adult hits stations under the Bounce Radio and Jack FM brands respectively.

 CKDG: Adult hits only during drive times. All other times station serves as a multicultural station.

United States

Mexico

Philippines

Europe
Oxfordshire, England – Jack FM
Cambridgeshire, England – Affinity
West Leicestershire, England – Oak FM
North Yorkshire, England – Coast & County Radio 
The Netherlands – Jack FM 
Gdynia, Poland – Jack FM 
Berlin, Germany – Jack FM
Vienna, Austria – Radio 88.6

New Zealand
New Zealand (Nationwide) – Classic Hits FM

Russia
 Moscow, Russia – KEKC 89.9
 Saint Petersburg, Russia – KEKC 91.1

Satellite Radio
Sirius Satellite Radio – Sirius Super Shuffle channel 12
XM Satellite Radio – Pink channel 24

See also
Adult album alternative
Adult contemporary music
Classic hits
Freeform (radio format)
Jack FM
Oldies

References

External links
Billy Anderson's Jack & Bob FM Guide - A comprehensive listing of all U.S. stations that currently use the adult hits format (Archived 2009-10-24)
VarietyHits.com - Information about the adult hits format and the stations that carry it
List of adult hits radio stations from radio-locator.com

20th century in music
21st century in music
Radio formats
Classic hits radio stations